Williamsburg International F.C. is an American amateur football club based in Brooklyn, New York. Established in 2011, the club's first and reserve teams play in the second division of the Cosmopolitan Soccer League, an elite amateur league, under the umbrella of the United States Adult Soccer Association.

Press

Williamsburg International FC Club President Charles von Rosenberg was interviewed by Game in Frame as part of the Spring preview series in January 2022. 

Williamsburg International FC Club Manager Jason Roos was interviewed as part of a feature on the club by Protagonist Soccer in February 2021.

The club was mentioned in a September 2020 op-ed in The New York Times on keeping New York's rich amateur soccer legacy alive during the COVID-19 pandemic.

In September 2018, the club was one of six teams featured in Front Row Soccer's coverage of the annual Sal Rapaglia Cup. Williamsburg International earned their spot in the tournament, reserved for the champions of the Eastern New York State Soccer Association's competitions, by winning the 2018 Jack Flamhaft Cup.

In February 2017, Charles von Rosenberg, one of the club's founders, was interviewed by American Pyramid Blog as part of their ongoing feature highlighting soccer at the local level.

In 2016, Josh Roos, WIFC Communications and Marketing Officer, was interviewed as part of ThemeBoy's showcase to discuss his redesign of the club's website.

History

Early years (2010–2013) 

Williamsburg International Football Club was founded in 2011 as "Doyle's Corner Football Club" in New York City. The club played in weeknight men's leagues in Manhattan, Queens, and Brooklyn before joining the Cosmopolitan Soccer League in August 2013.

A frequent early gathering spot for post-match drinks was Astoria’s Doyle’s Corner Pub, influencing the early naming of the team and referenced to this day through the club's moniker "The Doylies". It was here where the team first learned of the Cosmopolitan Soccer League and began to dream of a full-fledged eleven-a-side club.

During this time the club earned its first trophy by winning the 2013 New York Men’s Williamsburg Wednesday Fall Championship. The Doylies would go on to have continued success in weeknight leagues and small-sided tournaments, winning trophies in 2015, 2016, 2017, and 2018.

Rise in the Cosmopolitan Soccer League (2013–present) 

Under the direction of the club’s first head coach, Ben Reichner, the Doylies managed a successful inaugural campaign, including an undefeated spring half of the season.

Bennett Grubbs took the reins in the second season and began building a system and style that would grow into a championship formula. An underwhelming sophomore season, and an 8th place finish, gave way to optimism as the club entered its third year bursting with talent and possibility.

Capping off a third season in which they lost but a single match, Williamsburg were triumphant in a 3-0 defeat over Metro 2 East Conference Champions Shamrock SC at Randall’s Island on June 5, 2016 to win the 2015–16 CSL Metro 2 Division title. Goal scorers in the title match were Mark Gallagher (1) and Andreas Moudatsos (2).

Mark Gallagher took over coaching duties as the club moved up to the CSL’s Metro 1 Division. A change in division and a change in coaching had little impact on the Doylie’s fortunes as the team soared to a 13–2–3 finish, winning the division title by 4 points over NYFC Iliria. The Doylies clinched the title with an 8–1 romp over Deportivo Sociedade NY at Randall’s Island on May 14, 2017, with goals from Mark Gallagher, John Kaddo (2), Nicolas Mikolenko (3), and Charles von Rosenberg (2).

Back-to-back titles earned promotion for Williamsburg to the CSL’s second tier, where the club has made its home since 2017.

Club motto 
The club's official motto is "Maxime Parva Faciunt Differentiae" (The little things make all the difference).

The club's unofficial slogan is "Serious Fun".

Yearly records

Williamsburg International FC

2019-20 and 2020-21 seasons were shortened due to COVID-19.

Williamsburg International FC II

Williamsburg International FC III
 
2019-20 and 2020-21 seasons were shortened due to COVID-19.

Honors

Eastern New York State Soccer Association
 2017-2018 Division 1 Jack Flamhaft Cup Winners

Cosmopolitan Soccer League
 2016-2017 Metro 1 Division Champions
 2016-2017 Metro 1 Fair Play Award
 2015-2016 Metro 2 Division Champions
 2015-2016 Metro 2 Western Conference Champions
 2014-2015 Metro 2 Fair Play Award
 2013-2014 Metro 2 Fair Play Award

New York Mens Williamsburg Wednesday League
 2022 Winter Division 2 Champions
 2018 Spring Division 1 Champions
 2017 Fall Division 2 Champions
 2017 Summer Division 2 Champions
 2016 Fall Division 1 Champions
 2016 Fall Division 2 Champions
 2015 Fall Division 1 Champions
 2015 Fall Division 2 Champions
 2013 Fall Division 2 Champions

New York Soccer Summer Classic
 2017 Champions
 2016 Champions

New York Soccer Winter Classic
 2016 Champions

Club records

Hall of Fame
During Williamsburg International's 10th Anniversary Celebration, the club elected five members as part of an inaugural Hall of Fame cohort. In order to be considered for the Hall of Fame, players must no longer be active players. Hall of Fame nominees are voted on by current and former Williamsburg International players.

Class of 2022

Non-profit
In 2017, Williamsburg International FC was incorporated in New York State as a 501(c)(3) non-profit with the purpose of promoting the enjoyment of association football, to promote the enhancement of the football skills and sense of community of all its members through the arrangement of training, matches, and social activities.

Berk scholarship
Named in honor of Anna Berk, the wife of club founder Benjamin Reichner, the WIFC Berk Scholarship annually recognizes a young soccer player who embodies the values and spirit of sportsmanship, camaraderie, and outstanding character. Williamsburg International partners with local youth club F.C. Select to support young players in the Williamsburg community.

Executive committee

Current members
 President - Charles von Rosenberg
 Manager - Jason Roos
 Treasurer - Gerald van den Berg

Former members
 President (2013–2019) - John Erganian 
 Manager (2013–2016) - Benjamin Reichner
 Chief Brand Officer - Richard Butterworth

Rivalries 
Williamsburg International has enjoyed many rivalries over the years. The most consistent of these rivalries has been with New York Ukrainians, who share the Doylies home field at McCarren Park. The teams met frequently in the Eastern New York State Cup, with New York Ukrainians claiming early victories. In 2018, the Doylies beat the Ukrainians 2–1 in the semi-final match on their way to a trophy.

Since 2017, the teams have played twice a season as part of the Cosmopolitan Soccer League's second division.

Williamsburg International F.C enjoyed an engaging rivalry with cross-city club Flushing FC. This rivalry reached its height between 2016 and 2017 when Flushing FC posed a serious challenge to Williamsburg International FC's Metro 2 title run and then continued the rivalry with several thrilling matches against the Doylies reserve squad. Sadly, this rivalry ended in 2022 as Flushing FC dropped out of the Cosmopolitan Soccer League.

Inaugural season 

On September 8, 2013, Williamsburg International played its first competitive match in the Cosmopolitan Soccer League's Metro 2 division. The Doylies came from behind to defeat Brishna 5-4 at Bushwick Inlet Park, with Andrew Hilland knocking in the winner in the closing minutes. An up and down Fall campaign was followed by a fantastic stretch of seven straight victories in the Spring. The team finished in fourth place with nine wins, five losses, and two draws in its first season. The team's leading scorer on the season was Andreas Moudatsos, who finished with 11 goals in all competitions. Esteban Garcia led the team appearing in all 18 competitive matches, including both the State and League cup.

At the Cosmopolitan Soccer League's Annual Meeting in August 2014, Williamsburg International F.C. were awarded the Cosmopolitan Soccer League 2013–14 Metro 2 Division Fair Play Award.

References

External links 
 Official website
 Williamsburg International F.C. at Cosmopolitan Soccer League

Men's soccer clubs in New York (state)
Cosmopolitan Soccer League